General Assembly (GA) is an annual gathering of Unitarian Universalists of the Unitarian Universalist Association. It is held in June, in a different city in the United States every year. The last GA held outside the United States was in Quebec in 2002, after which congregations belonging to the Canadian Unitarian Council separated from the UUA. Member congregations (and three associate member organizations) send delegates and conventioneers to participate in the plenary sessions, workshops, regional gatherings, public witness events, and worship services. In recent years, attendance at each General Assembly has reached over 5,500.

Events
The General Assembly opens with a parade of banners borne by members of and representing member churches and associated organizations. General Sessions of General Assembly consist of discussing and voting on Study Action Issues and Statements of Conscience; elections for Board of Trustees, officer and committee positions; and reports from the President, Moderator and other leaders of the UUA. A Synergy Bridging ceremony is held to congratulate graduates of individual churches' Religious Education programs.

In addition, the event is keynoted by the Ware Lectures, which are offered by individuals selected by the President in consultation with the General Assembly Planning Committee; they have been held since 1922 by the preceding American Unitarian Association in honor of Harriet E. Ware, who bequeathed $5,000 to the AUA. Previous Ware Lecturers have included Reverends Martin Luther King Jr. and Jesse Jackson, author Kurt Vonnegut and Sister Simone Campbell. The most recent Ware Lecturer was Ibram X. Kendi.

Since a 2011 trial run, the General Assembly has allowed for remote online participation for congregations who are not able to send delegates in person. In 2020, due to COVID-19, all in-person programming initially scheduled to take place in Providence, Rhode Island were cancelled and moved to an online and remote format, resulting in the third-largest number of delegates in attendance behind the 2003 and 2007 General Assemblies. The 2021 iteration, initially pre-scheduled for Milwaukee, Wisconsin, was also moved to a virtual format. The 2022 General Assembly was held in a multi-platform format, with programming and participation in events occurring both in-person in Portland, Oregon and online.

Social Justice and Witness statements
Delegates of the General Assembly often passes a number of statements and guidances for social justice issues. Statements vary upon the description of weight for each statement:
 Statement of Conscience (SoC): An SoC is a statement which has been ratified by the General Assembly after three years of study and reflection (during which it remains in the stage of a Congregational Study/Action Issue (CSAI), with a fourth year dedicated to implementation. SoCs hold the weight of endorsement from the UUA at large. 
 Action of Immediate Witness (AIW): An AIW is a statement which only holds the weight of endorsement by delegates for a single GA iteration.

Actions
Actions taken at GA meetings have included the 1984 decision to approve religious
blessing of same-sex marriages, making the UUA the first major church to have done so.

At the 2007 General Assembly the Unitarian Universalist Association announced the new five year Comprehensive Fundraising Campaign entitled: "Now Is The Time: a Campaign to Grow Our Faith".  The campaign funds will support programs that will encourage growth of Unitarian Universalism as a whole.  These programs fall under the following categories: Growing Our Numbers, Growing Our Diversity, Growing Our Witness, Growing Our Leadership, and Growing Our Spirit.

Locations, themes and Ware Lecturers

*Future General Assemblies

References

External links
General Assembly Online
Now Is The Time Campaign Information

Recurring events established in 1922
Unitarian Universalism
Governing assemblies of religious organizations
June events
Christian conferences